Peter Morten Bredsdorff (2 December 1888 – 18 February 1984) was a Norwegian naval officer.

Early life 
On 2 December 1888, Bredsdorff was born in Kragerø, Norway. Bredsdorff's parents were ship-owner Harald Larsen (1851–1929) and Gunhild née Bredsdorff (1858–1944). In 1893, Bredsdorff assumed the last name Bredsdorff.

Education 
Bredsdorff graduated from the Norwegian Naval Academy in 1910.

Career 
As a Norwegian naval officer, Bredsdorff rose in ranks to Premier Lieutenant in 1913, Captain in 1928, Captain Commander in 1940 and Commander in 1942.

During the Second World War he served the exiled Norwegian government as chief commander of the 3rd Naval District. Based out of the United Kingdom and Svalbard, he was captured by German forces at Svalbard during Operation Zitronella in 1943. He was imprisoned in Schildberg from January 1944 and then Luckenwalde from January 1945 to the war's end.

After the war he led the Naval Corps (lang|no|Sjømilitære korps) from 1946 to 1953. From 1947 to 1951 he led the Naval Society and also served as aide-de-camp to Haakon VII of Norway. Bredsdorff was a Commander of the Order of Dannebrog and of the Legion of Honour, was decorated with the Defence Medal 1940–1945 with Star, the St. Olav's Medal with Oak Branch, the Haakon VII 70th Anniversary Medal and the Haakon VII Jubilee Medal 1905-1955.

He then left the armed forces, working as a controller in the whaling fleet between 1953 and 1957 and then as a trading merchant until 1960.

Personal life 
Bredsdorff died at 95 years of age and is buried in Kragerø.

References

1888 births
1984 deaths
People from Kragerø
Norwegian military personnel of World War II
Norwegian prisoners of war in World War II
Nazi concentration camp survivors
Recipients of the St. Olav's Medal
World War II prisoners of war held by Germany